John More (c. 1520 – c. 1576) was an English politician.

He was a member (MP) of the Parliament of England for West Looe in 1559 and Dartmouth in 1563.

References

1520 births
1576 deaths
Members of the Parliament of England for Dartmouth
Members of the pre-1707 English Parliament for constituencies in Cornwall
English MPs 1559
English MPs 1563–1567